Mount Okmok is the highest point on the rim of Okmok Caldera (Unmagim Anatuu in Aleut) on the northeastern part of Umnak Island in the eastern Aleutian Islands of Alaska. The volcano is currently rated by the Alaska Volcano Observatory as Aviation Alert Level Green and Volcanic-alert Level Normal.

Crater lakes 
A crater lake once filled much of the caldera, but the lake ultimately drained through a notch eroded in the northeast rim. Small, shallow remnants of the lake remained north of Cone D at an altitude of about : a small shallow lake located between the caldera rim and Cone D; a smaller lake (named Cone B Lake) farther north near the caldera's gate. After the 2008 eruption, the hydrogeology of the caldera was greatly changed with five separate sizable lakes now emplaced. In addition to the caldera lakes, Cone A, Cone E, Cone G and the new 2008 vent on Cone D contain small crater lakes.

Eruptive history 
Major eruptions of Okmok—with a Volcanic Explosivity Index (VEI) strength of 6—occurred approximately 8,300 and 2,050 years ago (i.e., BP). In 2020, volcanic ash deposits found in ice cores from the Greenland ice cap were found to have come from the eruption of Okmok Caldera previously dated between 150-50 BCE. Analysis of the ice cores resulted in a new, more precise date of 43-41 BCE. Based on the eruption date and global climate models, investigators hypothesize that the 43 BCE eruption led to crop failures and famine around the Mediterranean Sea, potentially influencing events surrounding the fall of the Roman Republic and the end of Pharaonic rule in Egypt.
After the caldera formed, numerous satellite cones and lava domes have formed on the flanks of the volcano. They include Mount Tulik, Mount Idak, and Jag Peak. At least seventeen eruptions of Okmok have been noted since 1805.

July 2008 eruption 

On Saturday, July 12, 2008, Okmok Caldera exploded without warning, sending a plume of ash to  into the air.

During the following five and a half days of nearly continuous eruption, residents of Nikolski (47 miles southwest) were stranded for periods of up to three weeks; Unalaska (73 miles northeast) was repeatedly dusted with ash and flights into and out of this major fishing hub were frequently disrupted; floating rafts of scoria and low visibility prompted the Coast Guard to close Umnak Pass to marine traffic; and the Bering Pacific cattle ranch on the flanks of Okmok was periodically evacuated, once during noon-time darkness caused by heavy ashfall. The eruption ended in August 2008. It had a VEI of 4, giving it a rating of "cataclysmic." No lava flow was reported in this eruption, though the volcano has issued flows in the past.

The eruption took place at a new vent in the northeast part of the caldera, creating a roughly 800 ft high cone, dramatically altering caldera hydrology, and discharging huge lahars, or volcanic mudflows, running from the caldera to the coast. In contrast, all 20th-century eruptions were from a cone near the southern rim of the caldera. The 2008 eruption was by far the largest eruption at Okmok since at least the early 13th century.

References

External links 

 Google Earth view
 
 Volcanoes of the Alaska Peninsula and Aleutian Islands-Selected Photographs
 "Sulfur Dioxide from Okmok Volcano", JPL/NASA image
 Okmok Volcano Ash Cloud Photo page of the Okmok Volcano ash could, July 22, 2008
Okmok Volcano on Volcano Discovery

Shield volcanoes of the United States
Active volcanoes
Landforms of Aleutians West Census Area, Alaska
Mountains of Alaska
Volcanoes of Alaska
VEI-6 volcanoes
Calderas of Alaska
Volcanic crater lakes
Subduction volcanoes
21st-century volcanic events
Umnak
Mountains of Unorganized Borough, Alaska
Volcanoes of Unorganized Borough, Alaska
Polygenetic shield volcanoes
Pleistocene shield volcanoes
Holocene shield volcanoes
Pleistocene calderas
Holocene calderas